, sylized as Yu-Gi-Oh! ARC-V, is a Japanese anime series animated by Gallop. It is the fifth main anime series in the Yu-Gi-Oh! franchise following Yu-Gi-Oh! Zexal. The series aired in Japan on TV Tokyo from April 6, 2014 to March 26, 2017. The series is licensed outside Japan by Konami Cross Media NY and launched internationally in 2015. 

A manga adaptation by Naohito Miyoshi began serialization in Shueisha's V Jump magazine in August 2015.

The series was succeeded by Yu-Gi-Oh! VRAINS, which premiered in Japan on May 10, 2017.

Plot

In Paradise City's You Show Duel School, a second-year middle school student named Yuya Sakaki aspires to become a professional Dueltainer. Yuya awakens a new power called Pendulum Summoning, which attracted the attention of the Leo Corporation's president, Declan Akaba. Yuya later meets three Duelists who greatly resemble him: The collected Xyz duelist Yuto whom he unknowingly absorbed, the overconfident Synchro duelist Yugo, and the sadistic Fusion duelist Yuri. These look-alikes originate from other dimensions besides Yuya's Standard Dimension as he and his friends find themselves in the middle of an interdimensional conflict against the Fusion Dimension's Duel Academy, which Yuri attends. Duel Academy is led by Declan's estranged father, Leo Akaba, who seeks to unite the four dimensions. Declan formed a group of elite duelists called the Lancers to stop his father, while they build their numbers during their travels to the Synchro and Xyz Dimensions.

Gradually recognizing a dark presence swelling inside him since absorbing Yuto, Yuya learns he has a strong psychic connection to him, Yugo, and Yuri that occurs whenever their summoned dragons are calling one another. Yuya and his friends also realized that Leo seeks to capture Yuya's childhood friend, Zuzu Boyle, and the Lancers' Fusion Dimension member, Celina, as they are identical to the Xyz Dimension's Lulu Obsidian and Rin of the Synchro Dimension who were already captured. Arriving in Fusion Dimension to save Celina, Zuzu gets captured as well with Yuya and the Lancers infiltrating Duel Academy to save the girls. When they confront Leo, he reveals the four dimensions used to be one world until the day a mad duelist named Zarc attempted to destroy everything. Leo intended to stop Zarc with the special En Cards he created. His daughter, Ray, steals the cards and sacrifices herself in his stead to defeat Zarc while splintering the world into the four dimensions.

Leo reveals that Zarc is the darkness within Yuya and his counterparts, who are themselves remnants of Zarc's scattered essence, which has been compelling them to absorb each other so Zarc can be reconstituted and exact his revenge. Only Ray, who has been reincarnated as Zuzu and her counterparts, had been subconsciously preventing Zarc's attempts to reawaken prior to Leo having the girls abducted. Leo intends to merge them back into his daughter and reunite the 4 dimensions into the Original Dimension using his Arc-V Reactor. However, the reactor is unable to fully restore Ray's physical form as Leo planned due to lack of life energies. After Yuri absorbed Yugo, Zarc capitalized on the turn of events by taking over Yuya's body and having him absorb the willing Yuri to complete his resurrection. Yuya's friends all proceed to challenge Zarc in a series of two-on-one duels to stop him while reaching out to Yuya. With Ray possessing Declan's adopted sister, Riley, to fight Zarc, Yuya manages to regain himself to help Ray defeat Zarc with the En Cards that splits the dimensions once more.

When Yuya awakens in the Standard Dimension that has been reborn as the Pendulum Dimension, he had no memory of his experience across the dimensions or of Zuzu until Declan restored his memories and everyone else's with a reenactment of the Arc League Championship. Declan reveals that Riley used a moment in the dimensional divide to transfer Zarc's essence from Yuya into herself to keep the evil spirit from being scattered across the dimensions again. Riley turned into a catatonic infant girl as a consequence of her action. Declan fears that Zarc may eventually take over Riley's body and resume his rampage again. Yuya is told that only he, as Zarc's essence, can stop Zarc for good by using his Dueltaining skills to make Riley smile and pacify the possessing spirit. Yuya proceeds to travel to other dimensions and defeat the other Lancers with Riley watching the footage. On his way, Yuya finds Zuzu and her counterparts still inside the Arc-V Reactor in an inactive state. Though his counterparts help him tame the Four Dragons, Yuya learns he made no progress with Riley. He convinces Declan to let him take the professional duelist test right after he got promoted into Senior class, and Declan became his opponent. Learning who Zarc was in his life, Yuya and his counterparts manage to defeat Declan and pacify their past counterpart. This act awakened Ray, who appears in the Pendulum Dimension and revives as Zuzu, with her counterparts now a part of her, similar to Yuya's case. The two of them are reunited at last, and the four dimensions are once again united into one.

Setting

Standard Dimension
The Standard Dimension, later reborn as the Pendulum Dimension, is the dimension where Paradise City is located. It is the main setting of the first season. Originally only having users of Tribute Summoning, the Standard Dimension now contains all three summoning methods of Fusion, Synchro, and Xyz, introduced to it by Leo Akaba and his Leo Corporation. This dimension is known for its unique Action Dueling, which uses the Real Solid Vision System to give mass to its holograms and allow Duelists to interact with their monsters and the artificially created environment. The Real Solid Vision System is an evolved form of the original Solid Vision System, which only had intangible holograms. After the battle against Zarc, the Standard Dimension was reborn as the Pendulum Dimension where everyone can now use Pendulum Summoning, in addition to all the other types.

It's the only dimension to not have versions of past Yu-Gi-Oh! characters. However, Yusho, Yuya's father, possesses a deck that heavily references Yugi Muto's Dark Magician based deck.

Synchro Dimension
The Synchro Dimension is a dimension where residents all use Synchro Summoning. It pays homage to Yu-Gi-Oh! 5D's. Its setting is New Domino City (also simply referred to as just "the City"), which serves as the setting of the second season. New Domino City thrives on a free competition society consisting of two classes. The elite class of 1%, the Topsiders, are the upper class society living in wealth, while the poor Commons are the lower class 99% of society living in poverty under the Topsiders' area. Discrimination against Commons is high, and they are treated as the tools for allowing the Tops to live in wealth. In rebellion against their limited freedom, the Commons started to duel while riding Duel Runners, which are motorcycles combined with Duel Disks. These duels later became known as Turbo Duels. New Domino City is ruled by the High Council, which upholds Martial Law and Sector Security who act as police for the Topsiders. To maintain the peace of the city, the High Council holds the yearly Friendship Cup, where Duelists from both the Topsiders and Commons can fairly duel each other on Duel Runners. However, those who lose are sent to an underground garbage refinery with little to no chance of returning to the surface. After Yuya's duel against Jack in the Friendship Cup final match, the High Council retired and the social class system was abolished. Some of the characters from the 5D's series reappear as different dimension counterparts, who are primarily the main characters, Jack Atlas, Crow Hogan, and Lazar, who only appears for one episode when Yuya duels Jack a second time.

Xyz Dimension
The Xyz Dimension is a dimension where its residents all use Xyz Summoning. It pays homage to Yu-Gi-Oh! Zexal. Its setting is Heartland City, which serves as the setting of the first half of the third season. Heartland City was reduced to ruin from the invasion by the Fusion Dimension's Duel Academy with the remaining survivors forming a Resistance group based in the ruined Heartland City becoming their base. Before the invasion, there were two sections of the Heartland Duel School called Spade School and Clover School, where both became the main forces for the Resistance group. The Spade Branch was wiped out in a later assault. Kite Tenjo is one of the main characters of Yu-Gi-Oh! Zexal, who makes a reappearance as a different world counterpart from the Zexal series.

Fusion Dimension
The Fusion Dimension is a dimension where its residents all use Fusion Summoning. It pays homage to Yu-Gi-Oh! GX. It serves as the setting of the second half of the third season. When Leo comes to the Fusion Dimension upon regaining his memories, he establishes the militant-based Duel Academy and gathers many strong Duelists from all over the dimension to achieve his goal of hunting down Ray's incarnations. The students of Duel Academy are mostly children who were taken from other families once of age. They are forced to remain on the campus to be trained as child soldiers until the Arc-Area Project is completed. Those who escaped from Duel Academy are branded as traitors and will be turned into cards as punishment. Alexis Rhodes and Aster Phoenix are two of the main characters from GX, who make their reappearance as different counterparts in this dimension.

Original Dimension
The Original Dimension, also known as the United World, was a futuristic utopia, the original form of the Four Dimensions and where the Real Solid Vision System truly originated. When Zarc began his rampage, Ray used the Four Nature Cards her father developed to splinter this reality, dividing Zarc's being and rendering him harmless at the cost of getting herself splintered in the process. Leo's goal is to restore the Original Dimension as a new dimension that he renamed ARC-V, by fusing the four dimensions and merging Zuzu and her counterparts with the ARC-V reactor he had created, which is powered by the life energies of the people who were turned into cards, so his daughter Ray can be reborn. After Ray uses the Nature Cards to split the world back into the four dimensions, Declan reveals the dimensions are still linked by the still active remains of ARC-V serving as wormholes, with Ray's essence still in the reactor core within the Fusion Dimension, until Yuya pacifies Zarc.

Media

Anime

Yu-Gi-Oh! Arc V was first announced in December 2013 in Shueisha's Weekly Shonen Jump magazine. The anime series aired on TV Tokyo between April 6, 2014 and March 26, 2017, which replaced Yu-Gi-Oh! Zexal in its initial time slot. 4K Media Inc. acquired the series outside of Japan and planned to release the series internationally in 2015. The 4K version had its debut on March 12, 2015 in Germany, Austria and Switzerland as part of the Yep! anime/cartoon block on ProSieben Maxx. In North America, a localized English adaptation began airing on Canada's Teletoon on July 24, 2015, and on Nicktoons in the United States on February 21, 2016.

Manga

A manga one-shot illustrated by Naohito Miyoshi was published in the July 2014 issue of Shueisha's V Jump magazine released on May 21, 2014. An English version was released on May 26, 2014 on Weekly Shonen Jump. A full adaptation by Miyoshi began serialization in V Jump on August 21, 2015. It began publication in English by Viz Media in its digital Shonen Jump on August 24, 2015. A spin-off manga by Akihiro Tomonaga titled  was serialized in Saikyō Jump between April 3, 2015 and August 3, 2017 and was collected in two volumes.

Music
There are four official soundtracks released by Marvelous Entertainment.
 The first, Yu-Gi-Oh! Arc-V Sound Duel 1 was released on August 20, 2014.
 The second, Yu-Gi-Oh! Arc-V Sound Duel 2 was released on January 20, 2015.
 The third, Yu-Gi-Oh! Arc-V Sound Duel 3 was released on June 24, 2015.
 The fourth and final, Yu-Gi-Oh! Arc-V Sound Duel 4 was released on March 28, 2018.
Opening themes
"Believe✕Believe" by Bullet Train (超特急) (Eps. 1-30)
"Burn!" by Bullet Train (超特急) (Eps. 31-49, Replaced)
"UNLEASH" (ハナテ, HANATE) by Gekidan Niagara (劇団ナイアガラ) (Eps. 50-75)
"Trump Card" (切り札, Kirifuda) by Cinema Staff (Eps. 76-98)
"LIGHT OF HOPE" (キボウノヒカリ, KIBOU NO HIKARI) by Unknown Number!!! (Eps. 99-124)
"Pendulum Beat!" by SUPER★DRAGON (Eps. 125-147)

Ending themes
"One Step" by P★Cute (Eps. 1-30)
"Future fighter!" by Yuya Sakaki (CV:Kenshō Ono) and Reiji Akaba (CV:Yoshimasa Hosoya) (Eps. 31-49)
"ARC of Smile!" by BOYS AND MEN (Eps. 50-75)
"Speaking" by Mrs. GREEN APPLE (Eps. 76-98)
"Vision" (ビジョン, Bijon) by Kuso linkai (空想委員会) (Eps. 99-124)
"Dashing Pendulum" (疾走ペンデュラム, Shissou Pendyuramu) by M!LK (Eps. 125-147)

English opening theme
"Can you Feel the Power" by Max Surla, Ali Theodore, Sarai Howard, Jordan Yaeger and Sergio Cabral (Eps. 1-147)

Trading Card Game

Yu-Gi-Oh! Arc-V added new game elements to the Yu-Gi-Oh! Trading Card Game. Following the release of Starter Deck 2014, Master Rule 3 came into effect, and introduced Pendulum Monsters to the trading card game. A hybrid of Monster and Spell, they can either be summoned conventionally, or "activated" in the newly added Pendulum Zones as Spell Cards, with their own separate effect. On the Pendulum Scale, the cards have a "Scale" a number that if there are two Pendulum Cards on both zones, the player can perform a new type of summon. Known as Pendulum Summoning, one per turn, the player is allowed to simultaneously Special Summon an unlimited amount of monsters from their hand (or face-up from their Extra Deck) to the field provided their Levels are in between (and not equal to) the Scales of the cards on the Pendulum Zone. With the release of the New Master Rules that were rolled out with the premiere of Yu-Gi-Oh! VRAINS, Pendulum Monsters from the Extra Deck can now only be summoned into either the Extra Monster Zone or under a Link Arrow. If a Pendulum Monster is destroyed or tributed while on the field, they do not go to the graveyard and instead go face-up into the Extra Deck, where the player can re-Pendulum Summon them at their next opportunity. If Pendulum Monsters are used as XYZ Material for an XYZ monster and they are removed via an XYZ Monster's effect, they go into the graveyard.

As for competitive rules, the player that goes first can no longer draw on their first Draw Phase. Both player can now control a Field Spell simultaneously and apply both Field Spell rules to the game.

Video game
A video game based on the series, Yu-Gi-Oh! Arc-V Tag Force Special was released in Japan on January 22, 2015. The game was released for the PSP.

Reception
The series ranked 64th in the Tokyo Anime Award Festival in Top 90 TV Anime 2016 category with 729 votes and ranked 250 in NHK Best 400 Anime of All Times to air on its channel. However, the series was received poorly on Japanese streaming site Niconico, taking all spots in the Top 10 Worst Rated Episodes.

References

External links
Official website 

2014 anime television series debuts
2014 manga
Adventure anime and manga
Anime spin-offs
Augmented reality in fiction
Comics based on television series
Crossover anime and manga
Fantasy anime and manga
Gallop (studio)
Medialink
Anime and manga about parallel universes
Shōnen manga
Shueisha franchises
Shueisha manga
TV Tokyo original programming
Yu-Gi-Oh!
Yu-Gi-Oh!-related anime
Viz Media manga